Hypoderma tarandi, also known as the reindeer warble fly and reindeer botfly, is a species of warble fly that is parasitic on reindeer.

The larvae of this fly are a skin-penetrating ectoparasite that usually infest populations of reindeer and caribou in Arctic areas, causing harm to the hides, meat and milk in domesticated herds. They also may cause ophthalmomyiasis in humans, leading to uveitis, glaucoma and retinal detachment. H. lineatum and H. sinense may also infest humans.

As food

In cold climates supporting reindeer- or caribou-reliant populations, large quantities of Hypoderma tarandi maggots are available to human populations during the butchery of animals.

Hypoderma tarandi larvae were part of the traditional diet of the Nunamiut people. Copious art dating back to the Pleistocene in Europe confirms their consumption in premodern times, as well.

The sixth episode of season one of the television series Beyond Survival entitled "The Inuit - Survivors of the Future" features survival expert Les Stroud and two Inuit guides hunting caribou on the northern coast of Baffin Island near Pond Inlet, Nunavut, Canada. Upon skinning and butchering of one of the animals, numerous larvae (presumably Hypoderma tarandi, although not explicitly stated) are apparent on the inside of the caribou pelt. Stroud and his two Inuit guides eat (albeit somewhat reluctantly) one larva each, with Stroud commenting that the larva "tastes like milk" and was historically commonly consumed by the Inuit.

See also
Botfly
Cephenemyia trompe, the reindeer nose botfly, another parasitic reindeer fly

References

External links 

 

Oestridae
Veterinary entomology
Parasitic flies
Parasitic arthropods of mammals
Reindeer
Edible insects
Insects of the Arctic
Flies described in 1758
Taxa named by Carl Linnaeus